The 2018 Summer Youth Olympics, officially known as the III Summer Youth Olympic Games, and commonly known as Buenos Aires 2018, were an international sports, cultural, and educational event held from 6 to 18 October 2018 in Buenos Aires, Argentina. They were the first Youth Olympic Games held outside of Eurasia, and the first Summer Games held outside of Asia and the first to be held in the Western and Southern hemispheres. It was the second Olympic Games held in South America after the 2016 Summer Olympics in Rio de Janeiro, Brazil.

Bidding

Six bids were initially submitted for the 2018 Summer Youth Olympics. Buenos Aires confirmed their bid in September 2011. On 13 February 2013, the IOC selected Buenos Aires as one of the three Candidate Cities for the 2018 Summer Youth Olympic Games. The other two candidate cities were Glasgow and Medellín. Guadalajara and Rotterdam failed to become candidates. Poznań withdrew their bid before the candidate cities were selected.

The host city election vote was held at an IOC Session in Lausanne. The results were as follows:

Development and preparation

Organisation

In October 2013, International Olympic Committee (IOC) President Thomas Bach appointed Namibian sprinter and four-time Olympic silver medalist Frank Fredericks as Chairman of the Coordination Commission for the 3rd Summer Youth Olympic Games — Buenos Aires 2018. Fredericks was 
heading the six-person IOC Coordination Commission made up of several Olympians including Danka Bartekova, the youngest IOC Member and Young Ambassador from the inaugural Youth Olympic Games in Singapore in 2010. This commission was completed by two other IOC members, China's Li Lingwei, winner of three World Badminton Championships, and Barry Maister, a member of New Zealand's hockey team that won the Olympic gold medals at 1976 Summer Olympics in Montreal; and Adham Sharara, Canadian President of the International Table Tennis Federation, and Henry Nuñez, head of the National Olympic Committee of Costa Rica. Working along with them there was the Buenos Aires Youth Olympic Games Organising Committee (BAYOGOC), that includes member of the Argentine Olympic Committee (AOC), the local government and the national government, and which CEO was Leandro Larrosa. The local organising committee involves young people in all levels of the organization; including an 'Athlete Commission' and a newly established 'Youth Commission' – a group of young consultants chosen by the AOC from local schools and universities – and the employees within BAYOGOC from junior to director level. The first Coordination Commission meeting took place in Buenos Aires on 27–28 September 2014.

During June 2015 a small delegation from Nanjing Youth Olympic Games Organizing Committee (NYOGOC) visited Buenos Aires for a series of debriefing workshops and seminars to pass on their expertise focusing on strategic decisions to be made in the early stages such as legacy, the use of the YOG to impact youth and sport, and benefits of the YOG to engage communities. The CEOs of Singapore 2010, Lillehammer 2016 and Innsbruck 2012 also took part of these meetings that were presided over by Frank Fredericks.

Football player and Olympic gold medalist Lionel Messi, originally not from Buenos Aires but from Rosario, was named as an ambassador of the 2018 YOG in March 2014, and he delivered a video welcoming message for the young athletes to Buenos Aires during the closing ceremony of the 2014 Summer Youth Olympics. In December 2015, the four-time olympic medalist Luciana Aymar was also named as an ambassador of Buenos Aires 2018. In July 2017, Olympic gold medalist Luis Scola was named ambassador of the 2018 YOG.

Joining the Olympic programme for the first time at Buenos Aires 2018 were BMX freestyle, kitesurfing, cross country running, beach handball, sport climbing, karate, breakdancing, and roller sports; and the event programme saw an increased gender balance. FIFA also decided to replace football with futsal at the Buenos Aires Youth Olympics, while other sports such as skateboarding were being considered for the programme. Roller speed skating was added to the Olympic programme on 17 March 2017.

Three years before the event, a survey showed that public support had reached 82.3 percent in favour of the Youth Olympic games in Buenos Aires. During the second visit of the International Olympic Committee's Coordination Commission to the city, on 13 and 14 August 2015, Mr. Fredericks highlighted the implementation of 13 of the recommendation of the Agenda 2020 by BAYOGOC.

Venues

The original plan was based on the bid for the 2004 Summer Olympics, in which a 15 km long Olympic Corridor would have worked instead of a more concentrated Olympic Park. For the Buenos Aires bid for the 2018 Summer Youth Olympics the Olympic Corridor was adapted into a Green Corridor, one of the two main sports zones as the primary sites of the Games in Buenos Aires 2018, being the other one Parque Roca, to the south of the city. The Green Corridor and the Olympic Corridor shared River Plate Stadium, Tiro Federal, Gimnasia y Esgrima de Buenos Aires, Parque Tres de Febrero, La Bombonera, La Rural and CeNARD as venues.

In order to group the sports in a more compact framework, in September 2014 a new four-clusters concept was revealed, dropping out venues such as La Rural. It was announced then that each cluster will include an area called YOG FEST where sporting experiences, family entertainment and cultural activities will take place. But at the 129th IOC Session, in August 2016, a new venues masterplan was presented, including two new stand-alone venues, adding La Rural once again and replacing Parque Sarmiento with Tecnópolis.

The International Olympic Committee members stayed at the Sheraton Hotel, located in the district of Retiro and close to Retiro railway station, one of the most important transportation hubs in Buenos Aires.

After numerous changes, in February 2018, the definitive venues plan was presented.

The Opening Ceremony was held at the Obelisco de Buenos Aires.

A. Green Park

Adjacent to downtown Buenos Aires and stretching three kilometres along the scenic banks of the River Plate, this area was distinguished by swathes of parks. It included the barrios of Núñez and Palermo. The Palermo Woods, a highly popular retreat for porteños and visitors alike, was the triathlon and cycling venue.

Venues located in Núñez can be reached by Belgrano Norte Line (at Ciudad Universitaria railway station) or by nearby Mitre Line (at Núñez Station) or Buenos Aires underground Line D (at Congreso de Tucumán Station). Venues located in Palermo can be reached by Mitre Line (Tres de Febrero and Lisandro de la Torre station).

B. Olympic Park

Located to the South of Buenos Aires, Roca Park is a vast area of 200 hectares in the district of Villa Soldati, a neighborhood that has been targeted by the local Government in need of urban development. One of the greenest areas in the metropolis, it is adjacent to the City Park and the Buenos Aires Automotive Racetrack. The Park, inaugurated in the 1980s, has many sports venues and recreational facilities, including the iconic Roca Park Athletics Stadium and the Roca Park Tennis Stadium. This area was also the site of the Youth Olympic Village (YOV), from where 65 percent of the athletes were able to walk to their competition venues, and after the event it will become the new location for the CeNARD.

The Parque Polideportivo Roca was fully renovated before the 2018 Summer Youth Olympics in order to be used as main Olympic Park. Six pavilions were built: Asia Pavilion (judo and wrestling), Africa Pavilion (fencing and modern pentathlon), Europe Pavilion (karate and weightlifting), Oceania Pavilion (boxing and taekwondo), America Pavilion (gymnastics) and natatorium. The complex also includes hockey and athletics field.

Olympic Park can be reached by Premetro tram at Cecilia Grierson station, or by the southern Metrobus line.

C. Urban Park

Located to the east of the city, this cluster occupies a significant portion of the Río de la Plata riverbank and includes the old Puerto Madero docks as venue for water sports. Rowing competitions were held over 500 metres rather than the usual 2,000 metres.

This area can be reached by Buenos Aires Underground lines A, B, D and E.

D. Techno Park

Located west of the city and next to the General Paz Avenue which marks the limit of Buenos Aires city, the 50 hectares science, technology, industry and art mega exhibition Tecnópolis was inaugurated in 2011 and was the venue for four sports competitions. This area can be access by Mitre Line Railway at Migueletes station or by Belgrano Norte Line at Saavedra or Padilla stations.

E. Stand Alone venues

The Games

Torch Relay

Athens (Greece) - La Plata (Buenos Aires) - Parana (Entre Rios) - Santa Fe (Santa Fe) - Iguazu (Misiones) - Corrientes (Corrientes) - Jujuy (Jujuy)  - Salta (Salta) - Tucuman (Tucuman) - Catamarca (Catamarca) - La Rioja (La Rioja) - Mendoza (Mendoza) - San Juan (San Juan) - Cordoba (Cordoba) - Neuquen (Neuquen) - Bariloche (Rio Negro) - Ushuaia (Tierra del Fuego) - Buenos Aires (Federal Capital) (Argentina)

Opening ceremony
The opening ceremony of the 2018 Summer Youth Olympics was held at the Obelisco de Buenos Aires on 6 October 2018 at 20:00 (8 PM) Argentina Time.

Sports
The 2018 Summer Youth Olympics featured 239 events in 32 sports. 239 events, there will be 12 mixed team events (Mixed-NOCs), 9 mixed team events (NOCs), 1 open event (Equestrian), 113 men's events, and 102 women's events.

 Aquatics

Demonstration sports
These were the demonstration sports in the games:

Participating National Olympic Committees
 A total of 206 countries sent at least one athlete to compete in the Games.
 Kosovo and South Sudan made their Youth Olympics debut.
 It was the first participation of Eswatini (formerly known as Swaziland) under its new name in any Olympic event

Number of athletes by National Olympic Committee

Schedule
The schedule for the 2018 Summer Youth Olympic Games was released on 9 May 2018, exactly 150 days before the starting of the games on its official website.

Closing ceremony

The closing ceremony of the 2018 Summer Youth Olympics was held at the Youth Olympic Village on 18 October 2018. The Olympic flag was handed over to the next host city, Senegalese capital Dakar for the 2022 Summer Youth Olympics.

Doping
Supatchanin Khamhaeng of Thailand originally won the gold medal at the Girls' +63 kg Weightlifting event, but was disqualified in 2019 after testing positive for a banned substance.

Medal table

Marketing

Emblem

The official emblem of the 2018 Summer Youth Olympics was presented in July 2015, three years before the games. The emblem reflects the diversity of Buenos Aires and it is inspired by the city's vibrant colours, eclectic culture, iconic architecture and the many neighbourhoods that make up the Argentine capital. Each letter represents a famous landmark, including the Floralis Genérica, Space Tower, the Columbus Theatre, the National Library and the Obelisk. A short video produced by the Buenos Aires Youth Olympic Games Organising Committee (BAYOGOC) shows what each letter on the emblem relates to.

Slogan
The slogan of these games is "Feel the Future" was unveiled on 8 April 2018.

Mascot

The olympic mascot of these games was unveiled on 29 May 2018. The mascot is a young Jaguar, its name "Pandi" is a combination of the scientific name of the species (Panthera onca) and the relationship of the mascot with the "digital world". The president of the Buenos Aires 2018 Organising Committee, Gerardo Werthein, said that the mascot "seeks to inspire young people on the transformative power of Olympism and sport".

The mascot was created by the Argentine agency Human Full Agency with direction of Peta Rivero y Hornos. While the animation short was made by the local production company Buda TV.

Official song
The official song of Buenos Aires 2018 is Alive, performed by Candelaria Molfese and Fernando Dente. It was produced by Radio Disney. The name of the song in Spanish is "Vamos Juntos" ("Let's go together"), which was also the name of the governing coalition for the 2017 legislative elections in Buenos Aires city.

Sponsors

See also
1951 Pan American Games
2006 South American Games
125th IOC Session
133rd IOC Session

References

External links

Official website 
Buenos Aires 2018 Official Twitter account
Buenos Aires 2018 Official Facebook site

 
Multi-sport events in Argentina
Youth Olympic Games by year
Olympic Games in Argentina
Youth sport in Argentina
Argentina at the Youth Olympics
2018
Summer Youth Olympics
Summer Youth Olympics
Summer Youth Olympics
International sports competitions hosted by Argentina
Summer Youth Olympics
Summer Youth Olympics